Making Fiends is a cartoon by Amy Winfrey which has had two incarnations:

Making Fiends (web cartoon), an online animated series (2003-2017).
Making Fiends (TV series), a televised version of the above which premiered in 2008.